John Toke (1 June 1671 – 1746) of Godinton, Kent was an English Member of Parliament and lawyer.

He was a member of the Middle Temple. He was a Member of Parliament (MP) for East Grinstead from 1702 to 1708.

He died in 1746, aged 75.

References

1671 births
1746 deaths
People from East Grinstead
Place of birth missing
English MPs 1702–1705
English MPs 1705–1707
British MPs 1707–1708
Members of the Parliament of Great Britain for English constituencies